The 1866 typhus epidemic in Finland ran until 1868.

In the 1860s, exceptionally harsh weather conditions and crop losses afflicted what was then the Grand Duchy of Finland, leading to famine and epidemic disease. 1866–68 saw hunger and especially what was thought of at the time as typhus killing 270,000 people in the region. Municipalities that were particularly badly hit were Eno, Ilomantsi, Pielisjärvi and Rautavaara in North Karelia, and Ostrobothnia, Satakunta and Häme.

References

19th-century epidemics
Epidemic typhus
History of Finland